The Federal Court of Malaysia is the highest court and the final appellate court in Malaysia. It is housed in the Palace of Justice in Putrajaya. The court was established during Malaya's independence in 1957 and received its current name in 1994.

History
The earliest predecessor of the Federal Court was the Court of Judicature of Prince of Wales' Island (now Penang), Singapore and Malacca, which was established by the Second Charter of Justice, issued by the Crown as letters patent dated 27 November 1826. The Court was presided over by the Governor of the Straits Settlements and Resident Councillor of the settlement where the court was to be held, and another judge called the Recorder. The Third Charter of Justice of 12 August 1855 reorganised the Court, providing the Straits Settlements with two Recorders, one for Prince of Wales' Island and the other for Singapore and Malacca.

Following the reconstitution of the Straits Settlements as a Crown colony with effect from 1 April 1867, the Court of Judicature was replaced by the Supreme Court of the Straits Settlements. The Governor and Resident Councillors ceased to be judges of the Court.

Further changes to the Court's constitution were made in 1873. It now consisted of two divisions – the Chief Justice and the Senior Puisne Judge formed the Singapore and Malacca division of the Court, while the Judge of Penang and the Junior Puisne Judge formed the Penang division. The Supreme Court also received jurisdiction to sit as a Court of Appeal in civil matters. In 1878 the jurisdiction and residence of judges was made more flexible, thus impliedly abolishing the geographical division of the Supreme Court. Appeals from decisions of the Supreme Court lay first to the Court of Appeal and then to the Queen-in-Council, the latter appeals being heard by the Judicial Committee of the Privy Council.

As a result of legislation passed in 1885, the Supreme Court consisted of the Chief Justice and three puisne judges. The Court was significantly altered in 1907. It now had two divisions, one exercising original civil and criminal jurisdiction and the other appellate civil and criminal jurisdiction.

During the Japanese occupation of Singapore (1942–1945), all the courts that had operated under the British were replaced by new courts established by the Japanese Military Administration. The Syonan Koto-Hoin (Supreme Court) was formed on 29 May 1942; there was also a Court of Appeal, but it was never convened.

Following the end of World War II, the courts that had existed before the war were restored. There was no change in the judicial system when the Straits Settlements were dissolved in 1946 and Singapore became a crown colony in its own right, except that the Supreme Court of the Straits Settlements became known as the Supreme Court of Singapore.

The courts of Penang and Malacca merged with the rest of Malaya to form the Supreme Court of the Federation of Malaya. This continued upon independence in 1957 until 1963. When Malaya, Sabah, Sarawak, and Singapore formed Malaysia in 1963, the court was renamed the Federal Court of Malaysia.

The judicial power of Malaysia was vested in a Federal Court, a High Court in Malaya, a High Court in Borneo (now the High Court in Sabah and Sarawak), and a High Court in Singapore (which replaced the Supreme Court of the Colony of Singapore). Appeals lay from the High Court in Singapore to the Federal Court in Kuala Lumpur, and then to the Privy Council.

The merger did not last: in 1965 Singapore was expelled from the Federation of Malaysia and became an independent republic. However, the High Court of Singapore remained part of the Malaysian Federal Court structure until 1969, when Singapore enacted the Supreme Court of Judicature Act to regularise the judicial system.

Before 1985, the Federal Court remained the second highest court in the land, being subordinate to the Privy Council in England. On 1 January 1978, appeals to the Privy Council in criminal and constitutional matters were abolished, while appeals in civil matters were abolished on 1 January 1985. When appeals to the Privy Council were abolished, the court was renamed Supreme Court of Malaysia. Finally, on 24 June 1994, as part of reforms, the court was once again renamed the Federal Court of Malaysia.

Current judges
The court is composed of the Chief Justice, President of the Court of Appeal, the Chief Judges of the High Court in Malaya and the High Court in Sabah and Sarawak and 11 other Federal Court judges. The Chief Justice is also the head of the judiciary in Malaysia. All judges are appointed by the Yang di-Pertuan Agong on the advice of the Prime Minister of Malaysia. All judges mandatorily retire at the age of 66 and 6 months. In order of seniority, they are as follows:

Building
The Federal Court is located in the Palace of Justice in the federal administrative capital of Putrajaya. It was previously housed in the Sultan Abdul Samad Building in Kuala Lumpur.

References

External links
 

Federal ministries, departments and agencies of Malaysia
Judiciary of Malaysia
Malaysia
1957 establishments in Malaya
Courts and tribunals established in 1957
Malaysian constitutional law